H.D. Stafford Middle School (formerly H.D. Stafford Secondary) is a public middle school in Langley, British Columbia, part of School District 35 Langley. It was formerly the only secondary school in Langley City (as opposed to the Township of Langley), but in September, 2008, HD Stafford Secondary became a Middle School.

History
H.D. Stafford School was originally opened as a high school, but with an expanding population was transformed into a full-fledged middle School.

In 2006, H.D. Stafford's athletics expanded to include a rugby team. Teams were running at the grade 8, junior varsity and varsity levels.

Notable alumni
Amanda Crew, actress
Ryan Steele, comedian
Alisen Down, actress

Conversion to a middle school
On May 22, 2007, it was revealed, at a school board meeting, that the Langley School District Trustees would vote in the fall on a recommendation to transform HD Stafford from a secondary school into a middle school, serving students from Grades 6 to 8. From Grade 9 to 12, Stafford students then would attend one of the remaining secondary schools in the Langley area. As a result, the Stafford community has rallied to save its school.  In an effort to save Stafford, students have exercised their right to protest.  A march to L.S.S. from H.D.S.S. was held to get their point across regarding the safety of students walking to and from school along busy roads.  Additionally students held a walk-out en masse which took them to the school board office.  Upon their arrival, Stafford students sat in silence to protest their silenced voices.

In October 2007, in a four to three vote, school board trustees voted to reconfigure HD Stafford Secondary into a Middle School.

Programs
H.D. Stafford was one of only a handful of schools in the province to be part of a pilot project for the AVID program.  AVID, Advancement Via Individual Determination, is an in-school program which prepares students for university eligibility and success.  AVID BC At the time of its closure as a secondary school, approximately 40% of Stafford's teachers are trained in AVID strategies.

Fine arts
The school is known for its Fine Arts program, offering classes in visual arts, dance, drama and music. In particular, known for its musical productions, the school's productions have included Chicago (2004–05), and Disney's Beauty and the Beast amongst others.

In mid-2017, the decision was made to integrate the fine arts program into the regular school stream, thus enrolment in the IFA program will cease as of the 2017-18 school year.

Explorations
Students at Stafford go through a series of programs that are called "Explorations". These explorations are designed to prepare students for life in a career and to develop their talents in real life scenarios. The Grade 6 and 7's have Cooking, OACES (Outdoor Aboriginal Community Environmental Services), Sewing and Visual Arts, and Metalwork and Woodwork as Explorations. The Grade 8's can pick three major explorations, Technology I, Technology II, Home Economics, Intensive Visual Art 2D/3D, Guitar, Dance Intensive, Drama (Improvisations and Theatre Games), Drama (Musical Theatre), and Drama (Intensive). The Grade 8's can also take three of the minor explorations, these are Yearbook, Visual Art 2D, Dance, Minor Games, Fitness and Conditioning, Team Games, Leadership, PE leadership, Intro. To Computers, Advanced Math, and Hands-on Science.

High schools in British Columbia
School District 35 Langley
Educational institutions in Canada with year of establishment missing